Postplatyptilia carchi is a moth of the family Pterophoridae. It is known from Colombia, Ecuador and Venezuela.

The wingspan is 13–15 mm. Adults are on wing in January, February and May.

Etymology
The species is named after the province where it was collected, Carchi.

References

carchi
Moths described in 2006